William Hards (25 March 1907 – 6 July 1971) was a South African cricketer. He played in nine first-class matches from 1926/27 to 1928/29.

References

External links
 

1907 births
1971 deaths
South African cricketers
Border cricketers
Eastern Province cricketers
People from Keiskammahoek
Cricketers from the Eastern Cape